Something Special – The Best of BigBang is a compilation of greatest hits of the Norwegian rock band BigBang, released in Norway on December 3, 2007.

Track listing
 "Wild Bird" (from Electric Psalmbook)
 "Saturn Freeway" (from Poetic Terrorism)
 "I Don't Wanna" (from Too Much Yang)
 "To the Mountains" (from Clouds Rolling By)
 "New Glow" (from Girl In Oslo EP)
 "Fly Like a Butterfly Sting Like a Bee" (from Poetic Terrorism)
 "Girl in Oslo" (from Clouds Rolling By)
 "One of a Kind" (from Frontside Rock'n'Roll)
 "Long Distance Man"  (from Electric Psalmbook)
 "Frontside Rock'n'Roll" (Acoustic live) (from Radio Radio TV Sleep)
 "In Your Heart" (new song)
 "Early December" (from Too Much Yang)
 "Hurricane Boy" (from Too Much Yang)
 "All the Time" (from Too Much Yang)
 "From a Distance" (from Poetic Terrorism)
 "Smiling For" (from Radio Radio TV Sleep)
 "Something Special" (from Electric Psalmbook)

References

Bigbang (Norwegian band) albums
2007 greatest hits albums